"Promise" is a song by Australian progressive rock band Voyager, released on 21 February 2023. The song is scheduled to represent Australia in the Eurovision Song Contest 2023 after the band was internally selected by the Special Broadcasting Service (SBS), Australia's broadcaster for the Eurovision Song Contest.

Eurovision Song Contest

Internal selection 
On 14 November 2022, the Special Broadcasting Service (SBS) announced that it would internally select the Australian entry for the Eurovision Song Contest 2023, foregoing the Eurovision – Australia Decides selection show the broadcaster had organised since 2019.

On 20 February 2023, SBS prepared a premiere for the official release of the song and the music video the following day, along with the artist reveal, which was later confirmed to be Voyager with "Promise".

At Eurovision 
According to Eurovision rules, all nations with the exceptions of the host country and the "Big Five" (France, Germany, Italy, Spain and the United Kingdom) are required to qualify from one of two semi-finals in order to compete for the final; the top ten countries from each semi-final progress to the final. The European Broadcasting Union (EBU) split up the competing countries into six different pots based on voting patterns from previous contests, with countries with favourable voting histories put into the same pot. On 31 January 2023, an allocation draw was held, which placed each country into one of the two semi-finals, and determined which half of the show they would perform in. Australia has been placed into the second semi-final, to be held on 11 May 2023, and has been scheduled to perform in the second half of the show.

Charts

References 

2023 songs
2023 singles
Eurovision songs of 2023
Eurovision songs of Australia